Clarence Ingals Fisher (August 21, 1909 – September 1, 1942) was an American sports shooter. He competed in the 25 m pistol event at the 1936 Summer Olympics. 

Outside sport, Fisher became manager of a timber estate. He was a captain in the US Army during the Second World War, when he contracted meningo-encephalitis, which led to his death.

References

External links
 

1909 births
1942 deaths
American male sport shooters
Olympic shooters of the United States
Shooters at the 1936 Summer Olympics
People from Lyons, Colorado
Sportspeople from Colorado
United States Army personnel killed in World War II
United States Army officers
Deaths from meningitis
Neurological disease deaths in Virginia
Infectious disease deaths in Virginia
Military personnel from Colorado
20th-century American people